This is a list of National Football League kickoff returners based on their career kickoff return yards. 

Brian Mitchell is the all-time leader with 14,014 kickoff return yards over 14 seasons. He played for the Washington Redskins, Philadelphia Eagles, and New York Giants.

Career leaders

Through  season

See also
 NFL records (individual)
 List of National Football League annual kickoff return yards leaders
 List of National Football League annual punt return yards leaders

References

Kickoff return yards leaders
Kickoff return yards leaders
National Football League lists